His Private Secretary is a 1933 American pre-Code comedy film directed by Phil Whitman and starring Evalyn Knapp and John Wayne. It is an early Wayne non-Western film appearance, made when he was 26 years old.

Plot
Dick Wallace (Wayne) has to prove to the preacher's daughter, his own father, his old friends, and himself that he is not just an irresponsible playboy. His new love Marion does a good job of convincing them. The question is whether or not it is true.

Cast
 Evalyn Knapp as Marion Hall
 John Wayne as Dick Wallace
 Reginald Barlow as Mr. Wallace
 Alec B. Francis as Rev. Hall
 Arthur Hoyt as Little
 Natalie Kingston as Polly
 Patrick Cunning as Van, Polly's Brother
 Al St. John as Garage Owner Tom
 Hugh Kidder as Jenkins, the Butler
 Mickey Rentschler as Joe Boyd

See also
 John Wayne filmography

References

External links

 

1933 films
1933 comedy films
American comedy films
American black-and-white films
1930s English-language films
Films directed by Phil Whitman
1930s American films